The relationship between animal ethics and environmental ethics concerns the differing ethical consideration of individual nonhuman animals—particularly those living in spaces outside of direct human control—and conceptual entities such as species, populations and ecosystems. The intersection of these two fields is a prominent component of vegan discourse.

Overview 
Generally, animal ethicists place the well-being and interests of sentient individuals at the center of their concern, while environmental ethicists focus on the preservation of biodiversity, populations, ecosystems, species and nature itself. Animal ethicists may also give value to these entities, but only so far as they are instrumentally valuable to sentient individuals. 

Environmental ethicists consider it justifiable to remove or kill individual animals belonging to introduced species, who are consider to threaten the preservation of ecological entities, such as endangered and native species, which they consider to be more valuable than members of more common species. These actions are frequently opposed by animal ethicists, who may argue for a gradation of value of individual animals based on their level of sentience and would not consider whether an individual animal exists naturally as morally relevant; to them the individual's capacity to suffer is what matters.

Environmental ethicists may support hunting, which harms individual animals, in cases when it is considered to be ecologically beneficial. Some animal ethicists argue that we have a moral obligation to take steps to reduce wild animal suffering; this is something that environmental ethicists are normally against.

These differences of opinion have led some ethicists to argue that animal ethics and environmental ethics are incompatible, while others assert that the positions are reconcilable, or that the disagreements are not as strong as they first appear.

Perspectives

Animal ethicists 
Animal rights philosopher Tom Regan, in his 1981 paper, conceived of an environmental ethic in which "nonconscious natural objects can have value in their own right, independently of human interests". In his 1982 book, The Case for Animal Rights, Regan argued that it is difficult to reconcile Aldo Leopold's holistic land ethic, where the "individual may be sacrificed for the greater biotic good", with the concept of animal rights and that, as a result, Leopold's view could justly be labelled as "environmental fascism".

The utilitarian philosopher Peter Singer, in Practical Ethics, argues for an environmental ethic which "fosters consideration for the interests of all sentient creatures, including subsequent generations stretching into the far future." 

Eze Paez and Catia Faria assert that animal and environmental ethics "have incompatible criteria of moral considerability" and "incompatible normative implications regarding the interests of sentient individuals"; they also claim that environmental ethics fails to give a proper account of the problem of wild animal suffering. Oscar Horta has argued that contrary to first appearances, "biocentric views should strongly support intervention" to relieve the suffering of animals in the wild.

Environmental ethicists 
J. Baird Callicott, in his 1980 paper "Animal Liberation: A Triangular Affair", was the first environmental philosopher to argue for "intractable practical differences" between the ethical foundations of Leopold's land ethic, taken as a paradigm for environmental ethics, with those of the animal liberation movement. Mark Sagoff made a similar case in his 1984 paper "Animal Liberation and Environmental Ethics: Bad Marriage, Quick Divorce", stating "[e]nvironmentalists cannot be animal liberationists. Animal liberationists cannot be environmentalists". In a follow-up paper, published in 1988, Callicott lamented the conflict that his earlier paper had sparked, stating "it would be far wiser to make common cause against a common enemy — the destructive forces at work ravaging the nonhuman world — than to continue squabbling among ourselves".

Michael Hutchins and Christin Wemmer in their 1986 paper "Wildlife Conservation and Animal Rights: Are They Compatible?", labelled the position of animal liberationists as "biologically illiterate and thus ill-equipped to provide an intelligent basis for wildlife conservation"; however, they conceded that "ethical philosophy faces a severe test when it comes to the conservation problem."

In a 1992 paper, Ned Hettinger raises the predation problem, in response to animal rights activists criticizing the environmental ethics of Holmes Rolston and his support of hunting, stating "[b]y arguing that humans should not join other predators and must not kill animals for basic needs, animal activists risk being committed to the view that all carnivorous predation is intrinsically evil".

Dale Jaimeson has argued that rather than being distinct positions, "animal liberation is an environmental ethic" and that it should be welcomed back by environmental ethicists.

Ricardo Rozzi has criticized animal ethicists for "taxonomic chauvinism" and has urged them to "reevaluate the participation of invertebrates in the moral community".

See also 
 Compassionate conservation
 Intrinsic value
 Opposition to hunting
 Sentiocentrism
 Speciesism
 Welfare biology
 Wildlife management

References

Further reading 

 

 
 
 
 
 
 
 
 
 
 

Animal ethics
Environmental ethics